The Helmarc Arena, also called Arena do Quilamba (Quilamba Arena), is a state-owned multi-purpose indoor arena used mostly for basketball in Belas, Angola. The arena has a seating capacity of 12,720, and features hardwood flooring, electronic scoreboard and a wide range of features that make it one of the most modern of its kind in Africa. It is therefore fit for such sports as basketball, handball, volleyball and roller hockey.

The arena was specifically built to host the 2013 Roller Hockey World Championship

In the 2017, the arena established a 13,000 sellout during a game a 2019 FIBA Basketball World Cup qualification game between the home nation and their neighbours of the Democratic Republic of Congo which was a record in spectators at that time. 

The court is located in the Quilamba neighborhood, and across the road to the Estádio 11 de Novembro.

References

Indoor arenas in Angola
Sports venues completed in 2013